The Soviet Union women's national artistic gymnastics team represented the Soviet Union in FIG international competitions. They were the dominant force in the sport from the 1950s until the Soviet Union's collapse. They lead the medal tally for women's artistic gymnastics with 88 medals including 33 gold. Larisa Latynina is also the most decorated female athlete at the Olympic games with a total of 18 medals. Soviet dominance was unprecedented in scale and longevity and was likely the result of the country's heavy investment in mass and elite sports to fulfill its political agenda.

History 
The Soviet Union won the team gold medal at the 1952 Summer Olympics - the first Olympics that the Soviet Union participated in, and they won the team gold for the next seven games. The winning streak was interrupted by the boycott of the 1984 Summer Olympics, but they won gold at the 1988 Summer Olympics - the last Olympics that the Soviet Union participated in. The Unified Team won the team gold at the 1992 Summer Olympics. The Soviet Union won team gold at every World Championships that they competed in (1954–1991) except 1966, 1979, and 1987 where they won silver.

Team competition results

Olympic Games 
 1952 —  gold medal
Nina Bocharova, Pelageya Danilova, Maria Gorokhovskaya, Medea Jugeli, Ekaterina Kalinchuk, Galina Minaicheva, Galina Shamrai, Galina Urbanovich
 1956 —  gold medal
Polina Astakhova, Lidiya Ivanova, Larisa Latynina, Tamara Manina, Sofia Muratova, Lyudmila Yegorova
 1960 —  gold medal
Polina Astakhova, Lidiya Ivanova, Larisa Latynina, Sofia Muratova, Margarita Nikolaeva, Tamara Zamotaylova
 1964 —  gold medal
Polina Astakhova, Lyudmila Gromova, Larisa Latynina, Tamara Manina, Yelena Volchetskaya, Tamara Zamotaylova
 1968 —  gold medal
Lyubov Burda, Olga Karasyova, Natalia Kuchinskaya, Larisa Petrik, Ludmilla Tourischeva, Zinaida Voronina
 1972 —  gold medal
Lyubov Burda, Olga Korbut, Antonina Koshel, Tamara Lazakovich, Elvira Saadi, Ludmilla Tourischeva
 1976 —  gold medal
Maria Filatova, Svetlana Grozdova, Nellie Kim, Olga Korbut, Elvira Saadi, Ludmilla Tourischeva
 1980 —  gold medal
Yelena Davydova, Maria Filatova, Nellie Kim, Yelena Naimushina, Natalia Shaposhnikova, Stella Zakharova
 1984 — did not participate due to boycott
 1988 —  gold medal
Svetlana Baitova, Svetlana Boginskaya, Natalia Lashchenova, Yelena Shevchenko, Yelena Shushunova, Olga Strazheva
 1992 —  gold medal – participated as the Unified Team
Svetlana Boginskaya, Oksana Chusovitina, Rozalia Galiyeva, Elena Grudneva, Tatiana Gutsu, Tatiana Lysenko

World Championships 

 1934 — did not participate
 1938 — did not participate
 1950 — did not participate
 1954 —  gold medal
Nina Bocharova, Pelageya Danilova, Maria Gorokhovskaya, Larisa Diriy, Tamara Manina, Sofia Muratova, Galina Rud'ko, Galina Sarabidze
 1958 —  gold medal
Polina Astakhova, Raisa Borisova, Lidiya Kalinina, Larisa Latynina, Tamara Manina, Sofia Muratova
 1962 —  gold medal
Polina Astakhova, Lidiya Ivanova, Larisa Latynina, Tamara Manina, Sofia Muratova, Irina Pervuschina
 1966 —  silver medal
Polina Astakhova, Zinaida Druzhinina, Olga Karaseva, Natalia Kuchinskaya, Larisa Latynina, Larisa Petrik
 1970 —  gold medal
Lyubov Burda, Olga Karaseva, Tamara Lazakovich, Larisa Petrik, Ludmilla Tourischeva, Zinaida Voronina
 1974 —  gold medal
Nina Dronova, Nellie Kim, Olga Korbut, Elvira Saadi, Rusudan Sikharulidze, Ludmilla Tourischeva
 1978 —  gold medal
Svetlana Agapova, Tatiana Arzhannikova, Maria Filatova, Nellie Kim, Elena Mukhina, Natalia Shaposhnikova
 1979 —  silver medal
Maria Filatova, Nellie Kim, Elena Naimushina, Natalia Shaposhnikova, Natalia Tereschenko, Stella Zakharova
 1981 —  gold medal
Olga Bicherova, Elena Davydova, Maria Filatova, Natalia Ilienko, Elena Polevaya, Stella Zakharova
 1983 —  gold medal
Olga Bicherova, Tatiana Frolova, Natalia Ilienko, Olga Mostepanova, Albina Shishova, Natalia Yurchenko
 1985 —  gold medal
Irina Baraksanova, Vera Kolesnikova, Olga Mostepanova, Oksana Omelianchik, Yelena Shushunova, Natalia Yurchenko
 1987 —  silver medal
Svetlana Baitova, Svetlana Boginskaya, Elena Gurova, Oksana Omelianchik, Yelena Shushunova, Tatiana Tuzhikova
 1989 —  gold medal
Svetlana Baitova, Svetlana Boginskaya, Olesia Dudnik, Natalia Laschenova, Elena Sazonenkova, Olga Strazheva
 1991 —  gold medal
Svetlana Boginskaya, Oksana Chusovitina, Rozalia Galiyeva, Tatiana Gutsu, Natalia Kalinina, Tatiana Lysenko

Most decorated gymnasts
This list includes all Soviet female artistic gymnasts who have won at least four medals at the Olympic Games and the World Artistic Gymnastics Championships combined.  This list does include medals won as the Unified Team at the Olympics and the Commonwealth of Independent States in 1992 but does not includes medals won under the flag of an independent nation after the dissolution of the Soviet Union.  Also not included are medals won at the 1984 Friendship Games (alternative Olympics).

Additionally medals won in the Team Portable Apparatus at the 1952 or 1956 Olympic Games are located under the Team column and are designated with an asterisk (*).

See also 
 Russia women's national gymnastics team
 List of Olympic female artistic gymnasts for the Soviet Union

References 

National women's artistic gymnastics teams
Gymnastics